The 1970–71 ABA season was the fourth season of the Denver Rockets. They finished 30-54, but finished in a tie for the fourth and final playoff spot. However, they lost the tiebreaker 115-109 to the Texas Chaparrals.

Roster

Season standings

Eastern Division

Western Division

Game log
 1970-71 Denver Rockets Schedule and Results | Basketball-Reference.com

Statistics

Awards and records
 ABA All-League Team: Larry Cannon

Transactions

References

Denver Nuggets seasons
Denver
Denver Nuggets
Denver Nuggets